Carlo Bergonzi (13 July 1924 – 25 July 2014) was an Italian operatic tenor. Although he performed and recorded some bel canto and verismo roles, he was above all associated with the operas of Giuseppe Verdi, including many of the composer's lesser known works he helped revive.  He sang more than forty other roles throughout his career.

Biography

Early life
Bergonzi was born in Polesine Parmense, near Parma in Northern Italy, on 13 July 1924. He was an only child. He later claimed he saw his first opera, Verdi’s Il trovatore, when he was  six years old. He sang in church, and soon he began to appear in children's opera roles in Busseto, a nearby town. After he left school at age 11 he began working in a Parma cheese factory. His father worked there too, and Carlo often got into trouble for singing.

At the age of 16, he began his vocal studies as a baritone at Arrigo Boito Conservatory in Parma with Maestro Ettore Campogalliani.

During World War II, Bergonzi became involved in anti-Nazi activities and was interned in a German prisoner-of-war camp in 1943. Two years later, he was freed by the Russians and walked 106 km in order to reach an American camp. However, while on his way, he drank unboiled water and contracted typhoid fever, from which he recovered within a year. After the war he returned to the Arrigo Boito Conservatory in Parma, weighing just over 36 kilograms (80 pounds).

Operatic career
In a 1985 interview with Opera Fanatics Stefan Zucker, Bergonzi cited 1948 as the year of his professional debut, as a baritone. He sang the role of Figaro in Rossini's The Barber of Seville, which he performed with a former prisoners' association which he joined after the war. It has been noted that the fee of 2,000 lire paid for his professional debut was insufficient to cover his meals and travel.

Other baritone roles which he undertook included those of Metifio in L'arlesiana, Doctor Malatesta in Don Pasquale, Belcore in L'elisir d'amore, Enrico Ashton in Lucia di Lammermoor , Ghirlino in Le astuzie di Bertoldo, Silvio in Pagliacci, David in L'amico Fritz, Alfio in Cavalleria rusticana, Albert in Werther, Marcello in La bohème, Sonora in La fanciulla del West, Sharpless in Madama Butterfly, Lescaut in Manon Lescaut, Laerte in Mignon,  the title role in Rigoletto, and Georgio Germont in La traviata.

However, he realized that the tenor repertoire was more suited to his voice, and after retraining, he made his debut as a tenor in the title role of Andrea Chénier at the Teatro Petruzzelli in Bari in 1951. That same year, Bergonzi sang at the Coliseum in Rome in a 50th anniversary concert of Verdi's death and the Italian state radio network RAI engaged Bergonzi for a series of broadcasts of the lesser-known Verdi operas for the same purpose.  These included  I due Foscari as well as Giovanna d'Arco and Simon Boccanegra.

In 1953, Bergonzi made his La Scala debut, creating the title role in Jacopo Napoli's opera Mas' Aniello which was based on the life of Tommaso Aniello, the 17th-century Italian fisherman-turned-revolutionary. His London debut as Alvaro in La forza del destino took place at the Stoll Theatre in 1953. His American debut was at the Lyric Opera of Chicago in 1955, and his Metropolitan Opera debut as Radamès in Aida came on 13 November 1956 when he (and Antonietta Stella) received a positive reaction from Howard Taubman in The New York Times. Bergonzi continued to sing at the Met for 32 years, his last performance there occurring on 12 November 1988 in the role of Edgardo in Donizetti's Lucia di Lammermoor.

He sang the role of Radames again for his debut with the Philadelphia Lyric Opera Company in 1961 and in 1962 he reprised the role of Alvaro for his debut with the Royal Opera, Covent Garden. He made his debut with the San Francisco Opera in 1969 as Don Alvaro in La forza del destino.

Bergonzi pursued a busy international career in the opera house and recording studio during the 1960s. His chief Italian tenor rivals in this period were Franco Corelli and Mario Del Monaco. Bergonzi outlasted all three, continuing to sing through the 1970s at major opera houses. But in the 1980s, as his own vocal quality deteriorated inevitably with age, he concentrated on recital work. In 1996, Bergonzi participated in conductor James Levine's 25th anniversary gala at the Metropolitan Opera. He gave his American farewell concert at Carnegie Hall on 17 April that same year.

However, an announcement that on 3 May 2000, he was to sing the title role in a concert performance of Verdi's Otello, conducted by Eve Queler and the Opera Orchestra of New York, attracted intense interest, particularly because he had never performed the demanding role on stage. Amongst others, the audience included Anna Moffo, Licia Albanese, Sherrill Milnes, José Carreras, Plácido Domingo and Luciano Pavarotti. Bergonzi was unable to finish the performance, supposedly suffering irritation from the air-conditioning in his dressing room. He withdrew after two acts, leaving the remaining two to be sung by Antonio Barasorda, a substitute singer. This performance was by wide critical consensus seen as a disaster.

After retiring, Bergonzi is credited with mentoring tenors Roberto Aronica, Giuliano Ciannella, Berle Sanford Rosenberg, Vincenzo La Scola, Filippo Lo Giudice, Philip Webb, Giorgio Casciari, Paul Caragiulo, Lance Clinker, Fernando del Valle and Salvatore Licitra. Soprano Frances Ginsberg was also one of his pupils.

Bergonzi left a legacy of many recordings of individual arias and complete operas, including works by Verdi, Puccini, Mascagni and Leoncavallo. However, of his early baritone roles, few of his audio recordings still exist.

Summary of his vocal attributes
In The New York Times obituary, Peter G. Davis, who reviewed a 1978 Carnegie Hall recital by Bergonzi in The Times is quoted as noting:
More than the sound of the voice, it is Mr. Bergonzi's way of using it that is so special. He is a natural singer in that everything he does seems right and inevitable—the artful phrasing, the coloristic variety, the perfectly positioned accents, the theatrical sense of well-proportioned climaxes, the honest emotional fervor. Best of all, Mr. Bergonzi obviously uses these effects artistically because he feels them rather than intellectualizes them—a rare instinctual gift, possibly the most precious one any musician can possess.

Alan Blyth, in his Gramophone survey of Bergonzi's greatest recordings, sums up the qualities of Bergonzi's voice:
His singing there [referring to an online example], even more his earlier Verdi discs, evinces an innate feeling for shaping a line on a long breath, an exemplary clarity of diction, words placed immaculately on the tone, an authoritative use of portamento and acuti. Add to those virtues the manner by which he gives to each phrase a sense of inevitability and you say to yourself, in a mood of sheer pleasure, this is exactly how the music ought to sound. In the theatre only Otello was beyond his capabilities, though his solos are movingly sung on the Philips set.

Personal life
In 1950 Bergonzi married Adele Aimi, with whom he had two sons, Maurizio and Marco; the former was born on the day Bergonzi made his tenor debut. Bergonzi owned homes in both Milan and Busseto, in addition to a restaurant and hotel in the latter, the "I Due Foscari", named after the Verdi opera about Venetian court intrigue.

Death
Bergonzi died on 25 July 2014, twelve days after his 90th birthday, in the Auxologico Institution in Milan. He was buried in the Vidalenzo Cemetery.

Repertory as tenor
Andrea Chénier. Bari, Teatro Petruzzelli, 18 January 1951
Giovanna d'Arco. Milan, RAI, 26 May 1951
Pagliacci. Milan, RAI, 10 June 1951
La forza del destino. Milan, RAI, 16 July 1951
Un ballo in maschera. Milan, Teatro Nuovo, 15 August 1951
Simon Boccanegra. Rome, RAI, 21 November 1951
I due Foscari. Milan, RAI, 5 December 1951
Adriana Lecouvreur. Prato, Teatro Metastasio, 31 December 1951
Faust. Bari, Teatro Petruzzelli, 8 January 1952
Jenůfa (Steva). Rome, Teatro dell'Opera, 17 April 1952
Ifigenia (by Pizzetti). Naples, San Carlo, 1 June 1952
Mefistofele. Rome, Baths of Caracalla, 1 July 1952
Madama Butterfly. Cagliari, August 1952
Mas' Aniello. Milan, La Scala, 25 March 1953
Rigoletto. Livorno, Teatro Goldoni, 20 May 1953
Aida. Buenos Aires, Colón, 24 July 1953
Tosca. Buenos Aires, Colón, 7 August 1953
Manon Lescaut. Rovigo, Teatro Sociale, 24 October 1953
Turandot. Catania, Massimo Teatro Bellini, 19 November 1953
Loreley. Reggio Emilia, Teatro Municipale, 2 February 1954
L'incoronazione di Poppea. Milan, RAI, 7 March 1954
Carmen. Monte Carlo, Salle Garnier, 30 January 1955
Lucia di Lammermoor. Brescia, Teatro Grande, 3 February 1955
Don Carlos. Buenos Aires, Teatro Colón, August 1955
La traviata. Salsomaggiore, Teatro Nuovo, 10 September 1955
Il tabarro. Chicago, Lyric, 16 November 1955
Cavalleria rusticana. Chicago, Lyric, 26 November 1955
L'amore dei tre re. Chicago, Lyric, 28 November 1955
La Gioconda. Trieste, Castello di San Giusto, 16 July 1956
Il trovatore. New York, MET, 13 November 1956
Fior di Maria. Milan, RAI, 30 January 1957
La bohème. Caracas, Teatro Municipal, October 1957
Macbeth. New York, MET, 5 February 1959
L'elisir d'amore. San Sebastian, Victoria Eugenia, 26 August 1959
Ernani. New York, MET, 26 November 1962
La Wally. New York, Carnegie Hall, 13 March 1968
Werther. Naples, Teatro San Carlo, 11 February 1969
Aida. Parma, Teatro Regio, date unk.
La forza del destino. Parma, Teatro Regio, date unk.
Norma. New York, MET, 3 March 1970
Luisa Miller. Genoa, Teatro Margherita, 20 September 1972
Edgar. New York, Carnegie Hall, 13 April 1977
I Lombardi alla prima crociata. San Diego, Russ Auditorium, 22 June 1979
Il corsaro. New York, Town Hall, 16 December 1981
Attila. Tulsa, Chapman Music Hall, 6 March 1982
Oberto. Munich, Bavarian Radio Recording Studio, 4–12 March 1983 
Otello - acts 1 and 2. New York, Carnegie Hall, 3 May 2000

Videography
 James Levine's 25th Anniversary Metropolitan Opera Gala (1996), Deutsche Grammophon DVD, B0004602-09

 Honour 
 : Knight Grand Cross of the Order of Merit of the Italian Republic (11 january 2011)

ReferencesNotesSources'''

List of Bergonzi's recordings, 1951 to 1889, on operadis-opera-discography.org.uk
Rosenthal, Harold (1998),  "Bergonzi, Carlo" in Stanley Sadie, (Ed.), The New Grove Dictionary of Opera'', Vol. One, pp. 421. London: Macmillan Publishers, Inc.

External links

Interview with Carlo Bergonzi by Bruce Duffie, September 30, 1981

1924 births
2014 deaths
Musicians from the Province of Parma
Italian operatic tenors
20th-century Italian  male opera singers
Knights Grand Cross of the Order of Merit of the Italian Republic